Carlton House was a mansion in Westminster, best known as the town residence of King George IV. It faced the south side of Pall Mall, and its gardens abutted St James's Park in the St James's district of London. The location of the house, now replaced by Carlton House Terrace, was a main reason for the creation of John Nash's ceremonial route from St James's to Regent's Park via Regent Street, Portland Place and Park Square: Lower Regent Street and Waterloo Place were originally laid out to form the approach to its front entrance.

An existing house was rebuilt at the beginning of the eighteenth century for Henry Boyle, created Baron Carleton in 1714, who bequeathed it to his nephew, the architect Lord Burlington. Burlington's mother sold it in 1732 to Frederick, Prince of Wales, for whom William Kent laid out the garden. Frederick's widow Augusta, Princess of Wales, enlarged the house; in 1783, when Frederick's grandson George, Prince of Wales, was granted possession of Carlton House and £60,000 to refurbish it, it was a rambling structure without architectural cohesion.

The Prince had the house substantially rebuilt by the architect Henry Holland between 1783 and 1796. By the time the Prince Regent and Henry Holland parted company in 1802, Carlton House was a spacious and opulent residence, which would have been designated a palace in many countries. From the 1780s it was the centre of a glittering alternative court to that of the Prince's parents at St James and Buckingham House. After 1811 when he became Prince Regent the house was altered and redecorated to suit an even larger amount of usage as a palace in all but name.

In 1820, on the death of his father, George III, the Prince Regent became King George IV. He deemed that Carlton House, the official royal residence of St. James's Palace and his parents' Buckingham House were all inadequate for his needs. Some consideration was given to rebuilding Carlton House on a far larger scale, but in the end Buckingham House was rebuilt as Buckingham Palace instead. Carlton House was demolished in 1826 and replaced with two grand white stuccoed terraces of expensive houses known as Carlton House Terrace. The proceeds of the leases were put towards the cost of Buckingham Palace.

Architectural history

When the Prince of Wales took possession in August 1783, Sir William Chambers was appointed as architect, but after a first survey, he was quickly replaced by Henry Holland. Both Chambers and Holland were proponents of the French neoclassical style of architecture, and Carlton House would be extremely influential in introducing the Louis XVI style to England.

Holland began working first on the State Apartments along the garden front, the principal reception rooms of the house. Construction commenced in 1784; when these rooms were visited in September 1785 by the usually critical Horace Walpole, he was impressed, writing that when completed, Carlton House would be "the most perfect in Europe".

The chimney-pieces were added 1783 to 1785 by the London sculptor Thomas Carter the Younger.

By the end of 1785, however, construction at Carlton House came to a halt because of the Prince of Wales's mounting debts: his unpaid bills following his marriage to Mrs. Fitzherbert amounted to £250,000. Parliament appointed a commission to investigate the huge cost overruns at Carlton House, and to draw up estimates on how much would be needed to complete the project. In May 1787, the Prince of Wales contritely approached his father, King George III, and persuaded him to provide the money to finish the house. When work resumed in the summer of 1787, with a budget of £60,000 to finish the house, it was with the assistance of many of the leading furniture makers and craftsmen of France. (The onset of the French Revolution soon ended all French royal and aristocratic commissions.) These French workers who contributed to this second phase at Carlton House were under the design supervision of the Parisian marchand-mercier Dominique Daguerre, who was the interior decorator for Marie Antoinette, and who was the agent through whom furniture by Adam Weisweiler was imported for the house.

Visitors entered the house through a hexastyle portico of Corinthian columns that led to a foyer that was flanked on either side by anterooms. Carlton House was unusual in that the visitor entered the house on the main floor. (Most London mansions and palaces of the time followed the Palladian architectural concept of a low ground floor (or rustic) with the principal floor above.)

From the foyer, the visitor entered the two-story top-lit entrance hall that was decorated with Ionic columns of yellow marble scagliola. Beyond the hall was an octagonal room that was also top lit. The octagonal room was flanked on the right by the grand staircase and flanked on the left by a courtyard, while straight ahead was the main anteroom. Once in the anteroom, the visitor either turned left into the private apartments of the Prince of Wales, or turned right into the formal reception rooms: Throne Room, drawing room, music room and dining room.

The lower ground floor was composed of a suite of low-ceilinged rooms which included a gothic dining room, a library for the Prince, a Chinese drawing room, and an astonishing gothic conservatory constructed of cast iron and stained glass. This suite of rooms was equipped with folding doors which provided an impressive enfilade when opened (on one occasion the entire length was used for one enormous banqueting table). The ground-floor rooms gave directly onto the garden facing the Mall, this receiving a landscaping scheme by the fashionable designer Humphry Repton which replaced the design by William Kent undertaken for the Prince's grandmother Princess Augusta.

Besides the magnificent French decor and furniture, Carlton House was hung with a superb collection of works of art. Many of the finest paintings now in the royal collection were collected by George IV for Carlton House. When Prince of Wales, George IV patronized contemporary artists such as Reynolds, Gainsborough, and Stubbs. With the Third Marquess of Hertford and Sir Charles Long acting as his art advisors, George IV also bought Old Master paintings by Rembrandt, Rubens, Van Dyck, Cuyp and Jan Steen. An 1816 inventory of Carlton House showed 136 pictures in the State Rooms, a further 67 in the Prince of Wales's private suite, and another 250 in other parts of the house.

Following the death of his father, George, now King as George IV, turned his attention from Carlton House to renovating and greatly enlarging Buckingham House as his primary London residence. This coincided with alterations to the planning of Regent Street (another of George's pet projects) which surprisingly resulted in the elimination of Carlton House to link Regent Street with the Mall. The Duke of York Steps and the twin Carlton House Terraces stand on the site of Carlton House.

When Carlton House was demolished, most of the furniture, carpets, and art works were moved to Buckingham Palace or other Royal residences. Many architectural features were reused as several Royal residences being built or remodelled at the time; these include Buckingham Palace and Windsor Castle, although Royal Lodge and possibly the Brighton Pavilion may have also received items. Chimney pieces installed at Buckingham Palace are certainly identifiable as coming from Carlton House as are many doors at Windsor Castle. The portico of Carlton House was eventually reused for the new National Gallery in Trafalgar Square.

The Carlton House writing table has straight legs with drawers in the frieze and a superstructure that wraps round the back, fitted with tiers of drawers. The name is contemporary: the cabinet-making firm of Gillow included one, with a sketch, in their in-house Cost Books, 1797. The original, no doubt made for the Prince Regent's use at Carlton House, has not been identified.

Cultural references
Oscar Wilde makes reference to Carlton House in his fictional novel The Picture of Dorian Gray, published in 1890. In chapter 11, as the protagonist looks over portraits of his ancestors, he writes, "What of the second Lord Beckenham, the companion of the Prince Regent in his wildest days, and one of the witnesses at the secret marriage with Mrs. Fitzherbert? How proud and handsome he was, with his chestnut curls and insolent pose! What passions had he bequeathed? The world had looked upon him as infamous. He had led the orgies at Carlton House. The star of the Garter glittered upon his breast."

Carlton House is referenced in the first episode of the 1979 television miniseries Prince Regent, in which George IV, then-Prince of Wales (portrayed by Peter Egan), commissions Henry Holland to refurbish it. When King George III refuses for the Prince to go to Germany for his desired military education, he demands Holland refurbish Carlton House with lavish extravagance with neither regard of cost nor his father's wishes.

Notes

References
John Gloag, A Short Dictionary of Furniture rev. ed. 1969
John Summerson, Georgian London (Barrie & Jenkins, 1986 ed.)
Dorothy Stroud, Henry Holland, His Life and Architecture, 1966
Walpole, Horace,Letters addressed to the Countess of Ossory, from the year 1769 to 1797, 1848

External links

Carlton House at georgianindex.net

1826 disestablishments in England
Former houses in the City of Westminster
Royal buildings in London
Royal residences in the United Kingdom
Buildings and structures demolished in 1826
John Nash buildings
Georgian architecture in the City of Westminster
Neoclassical architecture in London
Regency architecture in London
George IV of the United Kingdom
Frederick, Prince of Wales